Jolie & the Wanted was an American country music band composed of Jolie Edwards (lead vocals), Phil Symonds (guitar), Jonathan Trebing (guitar), Steve King (keyboards), Ethan Pilzer (bass guitar) and Andy Hull (drums). Signed to DreamWorks Records Nashville in 2000, the band released one studio album in 2001 and charted two singles on the Billboard Hot Country Songs charts. They split up in 2003.

History
Jolie & the Wanted released one full studio album, and four singles to radio. The album, which was self-titled, was released on June 26, 2001 on DreamWorks Records Nashville division. It included the singles "I Would" and "Boom", both of which reached a peak of No. 55 on the Billboard Hot Country Singles & Tracks (now Hot Country Songs) charts.

In 2003, the group announced they would no longer be recording together. Edwards later signed to Warner Bros. Nashville but did not release anything. She would later release an independent album, Livin' Proof, in 2006. Ethan Pilzer joined the MuzikMafia, an association of singer-songwriters led by Big & Rich.

Discography

Albums

Singles

Music videos

References

External links
Jolie Edwards Myspace

American country music groups
Musical groups established in 2000
DreamWorks Records artists